Emma Rees may refer to:
 Emma L. E. Rees, British academic
 The  Emma Rees case